Charles F. Reynolds III is an American geriatric psychiatrist currently UPMC Endowed Professor in Geriatric Psychiatry at University of Pittsburgh School of Medicine and Professor of Behavioral and Community Health Sciences at the Graduate School of Public Health.

Education
Reynolds graduated magna cum laude in philosophy from the University of Virginia and then earned his medical degree from Yale University School of Medicine in 1973.

References

University of Pittsburgh faculty
American psychiatrists
University of Virginia alumni
Yale School of Medicine alumni
Living people
Year of birth missing (living people)